Itaquaquecetuba is a train station on CPTM Line 12-Sapphire, located in the city of Itaquaquecetuba, in the state of São Paulo.

History
The station was built by EFCB on 7 February 1926, along with Variante de Poá, which was opened only on 1 January 1934. In the end of the 1970s, it received a new building built by RFFSA. Since 1 June 1994, it's operated by CPTM.

References

Companhia Paulista de Trens Metropolitanos stations
Railway stations opened in 1926